

History
The United Collegiate Hockey Conference men's ice hockey tournament began in 2018 with six of nine teams qualifying for the postseason. The received an automatic bid into the NCAA Tournament beginning in 2019.

2018

Note: * denotes overtime period(s)

2019

Note: * denotes overtime period(s)Note: Mini-games in italics

2020

Note: * denotes overtime period(s)Note: Mini-games in italics

2021

The 6th- and 7th-seeded teams were switched to reduce travel distances.

Note: * denotes overtime period(s)

2022

Note: * denotes overtime period(s)

2023

Note: * denotes overtime period(s)

Championships

See also
ECAC 2 TournamentECAC West Tournament

References

External links

Ice hockey
United Collegiate Hockey Conference
Recurring sporting events established in 2018